

This is a list of the National Register of Historic Places listings in Pike County, Pennsylvania.

This is intended to be a complete list of the properties and districts on the National Register of Historic Places in Pike County, Pennsylvania, United States. The locations of National Register properties and districts for which the latitude and longitude coordinates are included below, may be seen in a map.

There are 27 properties and districts listed on the National Register in the county. Two sites are further designated as National Historic Landmarks and another is designated as a National Historic Site.

Current listings

|}

Former listing

|}

See also
 List of Pennsylvania state historical markers in Pike County

References

 
Pike County